Stina Svensson (born 1970) is a Swedish politician, and since March 2011 spokesperson of the Feminist Initiative party, serving together with Gudrun Schyman and Sissela Nordling Blanco.

Biography
Born in Linköping, she has had a number of occupations, working, among other things, as a student assistant, assisting lighting technician, metal lather, and tour technician for Gothenburg City Theatre. Svensson lives in Gothenburg, and has a bachelor's degree in pedagogy, specializing on public health.

Chosen as spokesperson of the feminist political party Feminist Initiative in March 2011, she is a candidate for the Riksdag in the September 2014 general election. She has also been active in LGBTQ issues.

References

Living people
1970 births
Feminist Initiative (Sweden) politicians
Leaders of political parties in Sweden
People from Linköping